Ernst Albert Gäumann (6 October 1893 – 5 December 1963) was a Swiss botanist and mycologist. Born in Lyss, Canton of Bern, he obtained his early education in Biel, where he experienced both German and French languages and cultures. Studying with Eduard Fischer at the University of Bern, Gäumann received his PhD in 1917 for his research on Peronospora, a genus of water molds. After travels and study in Sweden, the United States, and the East Indies, Gäumann worked as a plant pathologist in Buitenzorg, Java, from 1919 to 1922, and then as a botanist in Zurich for several years. He held a position at the Swiss Federal Institute of Technology from 1927 until his death.

Gäumann had diverse research interests, including plant pathology, soil algae, rust fungi, and fungal evolution. When he was 33, he published his work Vergleichende Morphologie der Pilze, the English translation of which became a standard textbook for mycology. Other works that were well-received included his 1952 The Fungi–A Description of their Morphological Features and Evolutionary Development and his 1959 monograph Die Rostpilze Mitteleuropas (Rust Fungi of Middle Europe). Gäumann published over 200 scientific papers, and described at least 25 new species. He worked as an editor for the scientific journals Plant and Soil, Sydowia, and Phytopathologische Zeitschrift.

References

Swiss mycologists
1893 births
1963 deaths
University of Bern alumni
Academic staff of ETH Zurich
People from Lyss